The Permanent Interdicasterial Commission for the Church in Eastern Europe is part of the Roman Curia. It was established in 1991 to better deal with the rapidly changing situation in the early 1990s. The Commission has as its president the Cardinal Secretary of State. Other members include the Secretary and Under-Secretary for Relations with States. As well as the secretaries of the Congregation for the Oriental Churches, Congregation for the Clergy, Congregation for Institutes of Consecrated Life and Societies of Apostolic Life and the Pontifical Council for Promoting Christian Unity.

Presidents of the Permanent Interdicasterial Commission for the Church in Eastern Europe

Cardinal Angelo Sodano (1 December 199015 September 2006)
Cardinal Tarcisio Bertone, S.D.B. (15 September 200615 October 2013) 
Cardinal Pietro Parolin (15 October 2013present)

Actual members
Archbishop Paul Richard Gallagher - Secretary
Archbishop Cyril Vasiľ, S.J. 
Archbishop Joël Mercier 
Archbishop José Rodríguez Carballo, O.F.M. 
Bishop Brian Farrell, L.C. 
Msgr. Antoine Camilleri

See also
Roman Curia
Interdicasterial Commission for Consecrated Religious

References

Interdicasterial commissions